The 2022–23 Russian Premier League (known as the Mir Russian Premier League, also written as Mir Russian Premier Liga for sponsorship reasons) is the 31st season of the premier football competition in Russia since the dissolution of the Soviet Union and the 19th under the current Russian Premier League name.

Teams
As in the previous season, 16 teams played in the 2022–23 season. After the 2021–22 season, Arsenal Tula, Rubin Kazan and Ufa were all relegated to the 2022–23 Russian Football National League. They were replaced by Torpedo Moscow, Fakel Voronezh and Orenburg. FC Nizhny Novgorod was renamed to FC Pari Nizhny Novgorod for sponsorship reason.

Venues

Personnel and kits

Managerial changes

Tournament format and regulations
The 16 teams play a round-robin tournament whereby each team plays each one of the other teams twice, once at home and once away. Thus, a total of 240 matches played, with 30 matches played by each team.

The season started 15 July, with the first half of the season ending on 13 November, allowing for the 2022 FIFA World Cup. The second half of the season will begin the weekend of 4-5 March with the final round of matches scheduled for 3 June 2023.

Promotion and relegation 
For the purpose of determining First League positions for the following, the teams that will not pass 2023–24 RPL licensing or drop out of 2023–24 season for any other reason, or the second teams of RPL clubs (such as FC Krasnodar-2), or the teams that finished lower than 6th place in First League standings will not be considered. For example, if the teams that finished 1st, 3rd and 4th in the First League standings fail licensing, the team that finished 2nd will be considered 1st-placed team, the team that finished 5th will be considered 2nd-placed team and the team that finished 6th will be considered 3rd-placed team. There will be no designated 4th-placed team in this scenario.

The teams that finish 15th and 16th will be relegated to the 2023–24 First League, while the top 2 in that league will be promoted to the Premier League for the 2023–24 season.

The 13th and 14th Premier League teams will play the 4th and 3rd 2022–23 First League teams respectively in two (home-and-away) playoff games, with penalty shootout in effect, if necessary (away goals rule for these games has been abolished beginning from this season), the winners will secure Premier League spots for the 2023–24 season. If both of the teams that finish RPL in 13th and 14th place fail licensing for the 2023–24 season or drop out for any other reason, play-offs will not be held, and 3th and 4th First League teams will be promoted automatically. If one of the teams that place 13th and 14th in the Premier League fails licensing for 2023–24 season or drops out for other reasons, 3rd First League team will be promoted automatically and the 13th or 14th-placed team that passes licensing will play 4th First League team in playoffs, with the winners securing the Premier League spot. If only one First League team is eligible for the play-offs (as in the example scenario above), that team will play the 14th-placed RPL team in playoffs, with the winners securing the Premier League spot, and the 13th RPL team will remain in the league. If none of the First League teams are eligible for the play-offs, they will not be held and 13th and 14th-placed RPL teams will remain in the league. If any of the teams are unable to participate in the season after the play-offs have been concluded, or there are not enough teams that pass licensing to follow the above procedures, the replacement will be chosen by the Russian Football Union in consultation with RPL and FNL.

Any team can be excluded from the Premier League during the season for the following reasons: a) using counterfeit documents or providing inaccurate information to the league; b) not arriving to the game on more than one occasion; c) match fixing. Such a team is automatically relegated and is not replaced during the season, and only one additional team (that gains the least amount of points at the end of the season) is directly relegated. If the excluded team plays fewer than 15 games at the time of exclusion, all its results would be annulled and will not count for the standings. If the excluded team plays at least 15 games at the time of exclusion, all their remaining opponents are awarded a victory, without effect on their goal difference.

Season events

Issues related to the Russian invasion of Ukraine
On 21 June 2022, FIFA extended their ruling that would allow foreign players in Russia to unilaterally suspend their contracts with their clubs, and sign with a club outside of Russia until 30 June 2023.

Players who suspended their contracts

Fan ID introduction and related issues
A new mandatory government-issued electronic identification document officially called "fan card" and colloquially referred to as "Fan ID" was introduced before the season. Similar ID cards were used during the 2018 FIFA World Cup and Russia-hosted UEFA Euro 2020 games. The ID is a QR code issued after an application online and a visit to a government office to confirm identity. The ID was mandatory from the beginning of the season to attend games at the home stadiums of PFC Sochi, FC Rostov, FC Ural Yekaterinburg, PFC Krylia Sovetov Samara and FC Pari Nizhny Novgorod, and was expanded for all the remaining stadiums in December 2022. It would not be issued to fans who were banned from attending games by court due to committing violations at previous games such as launching firecrackers or fighting other fans.

In June 2022, Communist Party of the Russian Federation introduced a draft of a new law to reverse the introduction of Fan ID.

Ultras for most Premier League clubs (with the exception of FC Akhmat Grozny) boycotted the games in protest against Fan ID, considering it a privacy and rights violation. Ultras for FC Zenit Saint Petersburg boycotted the games where Fan ID was mandatory, but attended the games where it was not yet introduced.

Attendance was significantly lowered at the stadiums that introduced Fan ID. The August game between FC Ural Yekaterinburg and FC Spartak Moscow was attended by 8,931 people, while the attendance for the 2021–22 season game in May between the same teams was 26,402. A Russian Cup game between FC Rostov and FC Dynamo Moscow was attended by 28,931 people (Fan ID is not mandatory at Cup games except the final), and the previous Rostov league game against PFC CSKA Moscow only had 8,616 atttendees. Overall, the average attendance at the games where Fan ID was mandatory was about half of overall average attendance. According to league's president Aleksandr Alayev, 315,000 people were issued Fan ID by late November. By late February, as the season was about to resume after the winter break, 450,000 people were issued Fan ID.

Pari NN–Torpedo game
In the game played on 19 March 2023 between FC Pari Nizhny Novgorod and FC Torpedo Moscow that ended in a 1–1 draw, Pari NN started Yaroslav Mikhaylov. Mikhaylov started the season with FC Zenit Saint Petersburg before moving on loan to Pari NN, and received a caution in two Russian Second League games for the reserve team FC Zenit-2 Saint Petersburg. He then received caution two more times in RPL games for Pari NN. According to RPL regulations, receiving four cautions leads to an automatic one-game disqualification, and cautions received in the current season in Russian First League or Russian Second League games count for the total, with the exception of the cautions received in games for the current club's reserve team (which Pari NN does not have). The league allowed Mikhaylov to be fielded as their computer system that automatically tracks disqualifications only accounts for the cautions received in RPL games, and the clubs are responsible for tracking the lower-leagues cautions themselves. Torpedo announced that they will lodge a protest and will demand the game to be awarded to them.

League table

Results

Season statistics

Top goalscorers

Hat-tricks

Clean sheets

Awards

Monthly awards

References

External links

https://www.championat.com/football/_russiapl.html
https://rsport.ria.ru/20210216/futbol-1597726161.html
https://www.championat.com/football/_russiapl/tournament/4465/calendar/

Russian Premier League seasons
1
Russian Premier League|Rus
Sports events affected by the 2022 Russian invasion of Ukraine
Russia